HERMES 5 is a project management method for IT, services, products and business organisations and was developed by the federal administration of Switzerland. This method is an open standard available to all. Many cantons, cities, educational institutions and private sector companies have successfully introduced HERMES 5.
HERMES 5 is an open eGovernment Switzerland Programme Office (eGov) standard, no. 0054 and is the standard in the Federal Administration for project management.

Objectives and concept 
HERMES 5 is a project management method which has been reduced to the essential elements and can be adapted to individual projects and organisations.

It provides full support with scenarios for concrete project processes, a web tool for methodical support, checklists and templates for efficient project management.

The method is a simple one and is understandable and does not address the methodologists, rather it addresses the project managers and those involved in the project. It contains clear task descriptions with activities, concrete role descriptions for cross-organisational cooperation and document templates for quick results. It allows an efficient and transparent approach to the project.

HERMES provides support to all of those involved in the project, i.e. the client with governance and sustainability, the project leader with planning, checking and management, the specialists with project execution, the core organisation in coordinating the project with the organisational goals.

The progress of the project is clear and manageable due to the four phases with the predefined milestones.

Scenarios 
Each organisation has various projects which differ from each other in terms of their content and complexity. It is for this reason that HERMES provides various scenarios.  
Depending on the content of the project, the project leader selects a suitable scenario which can be individually adapted. HERMES provides a series of standard scenarios. These scenarios can be adapted according to the requirements of the organisation. The individual scenarios can be made available to other HERMES 5 users and can be recommended for validation to the eCH association.

Modules 
Modules are reusable components for drawing up scenarios. Tasks, results and roles which topically belong together are grouped into a module. They serve as components for scenarios.

Phases and milestones 
The four phases, initialisation, concept, realisation and introduction form the basis of this method. There is a milestone at the start and at the end of each phase.

Roles 
The roles of client, project leader and technical specialist must be filled as a minimum requirement for the duration of the project. There is a description for each role including responsibility and allocation to a hierarchical level. The client role is always assigned to an individual.

Tasks and results 
Results are generated using tasks. HERMES is structured in a results-oriented manner. Tasks and roles are assigned to the results.

Background 
This method was developed in 1975 and has been further developed with the active support of users and technical experts on a continuous basis.

HERMES has been used in Switzerland's Federal Administration since 1975 in the management and execution of IT projects. HERMES has been further developed over the years and underwent revisions in 1986, 1995, 2003 and 2005. HERMES 5 was launched in 2012.

Training and certification 
HERMES provides training for all interested parties from those who have done the basic course to project leaders.  
Certification is also available. Certification consists of two levels: foundation level for project employees and advanced level for project leaders.

References

External links
 The HERMES method home page and portal to HERMES resources.
 Swiss Project Management
 Hermes PM
 Hermes Project Management
 TÜV SÜD story

Project management techniques